Gotthelf Fischer von Waldheim (13 October 1771 – 18 October 1853) was a Saxon anatomist, entomologist and paleontologist.

Fischer was born as Gotthilf Fischer in Waldheim, Saxony, the son of a linen weaver. He studied medicine at Leipzig. He travelled to Vienna and Paris with his friend Alexander von Humboldt and studied under Georges Cuvier. He took up a professorship at Mainz, and then in 1804 became Professor of Natural History and Director of the Demidov Natural History Museum at the Moscow University. In August 1805 he founded the Société Impériale des Naturalistes de Moscou. Fischer was elected a Foreign Honorary Member of the American Academy of Arts and Sciences in 1812 and a member of the American Philosophical Society in 1818.

Fischer was mainly engaged in the classification of invertebrates, the result of which was his Entomographia Imperii Rossici (1820–1851). He also spent time studying fossils from the area around Moscow.

Due to his work studying the insects of Russia, the Russian government granted him nobility as well as the "von Waldheim" ending to his name.

Partial list of publications 

Versuch über die Schwimmblase der Fische, Leipzig 1795
Mémoire pour servir d'introduction à un ouvrage sur la respiration des animaux, Paris 1798
J. Ingenhousz über Ernährung der Pflanzen und Fruchtbarkeit des Bodens aus dem Englischen übersetzt und mit Anmerkungen versehen von Gotthelf Fischer. Nebst einer Einleitung über einige Gegenstände der Pflanzenphysiologie von F. A. von Humboldt, Leipzig 1798
Ueber die verschiedene Form des Intermaxillarknochens in verschiedenen Thieren, Leipzig 1800
Beschreibung einiger typographischer Seltenheiten. Nebst Beyträgen zur Erfindungsgeschichte der Buchdruckerkunst, Mainz und Nürnberg 1800
Naturhistorische Fragmente, Frankfurt am Main 1801
Beschreibung typographischer Seltenheiten und merkwürdiger Handschriften nebst Beyträgen zur Erfindungsgeschichte der Buchdruckerkunst, Mainz um 1801
Essai sur les monuments typographiques de Jean Gutenberg, Mayençais, inventeur de l'imprimerie, Mainz 1801/1802
Das Nationalmuseum der Naturgeschichte zu Paris, 1802
Vorlesungen über vergleichende Anatomie, deutsche Übersetzung der Vorlesungen Georges Cuviers, Braunschweig 1801–1802
Lettre au citoyen E. Geoffroy ... sur une ouvelle espèce de Loris : accompagnée de la description d'un craniomètre de nouvelle invention, Mainz 1804
Anatomie der Maki und der ihnen verwandten Thiere, Frankfurt am Main 1804
Tableaux synoptiques de zoognose, 1805
Museum Demidoff, ou catalogue systématique et raisonné des curiosités etc. donnés a l'université de Moscou par Paul de Demidoff, Moskau 1806
Muséum d'Histoire naturelle de l'université impériale de Moscou, 18069
Notices sur les fossiles de Moscou, 1809–1811
Notices d'un animal fossile de Sibérie, 1811
Onomasticon du Système d'Oryctognoise, 1811
Zoognosia tabulis synopticis illustrata, in usum prälectionum Academiae Imperialis Medico-Chirurgicae Mosquentis edita, Moskau 1813
Observations sur quelques Diptères de Russie, 1813
Essai sur la Turquoie et sur la Calaite, Moskau 1816
Adversaria zoologica, 1817–1823
Entomographie de la Russie, Moskau 1820–1851
Prodromus Petromatognosiae animalium systematicae, continens bibliographiam animalium fossilium, Moskau 1829–1832
Oryctographie du gouvernement de Moscou, 1830–1837
Bibliographia Palaeonthologica Animalium Systematica, Moskau 1834
Einige Worte an die Mainzer, bei der Feierlichkeit des dem Erfinder der Buchdruckerkunst Johann Gutenberg in Mainz zu errichtenden Denkmals, Moskau 1836
Recherches sur les ossements fossiles de la Russie, Moskau 1836–1839
Spicilegium entomoraphiae Rossicae, Moskau 1844

References 
Biographies for Birdwatchers, Barbara and Richard Mearns

External links 
 

German entomologists
German paleontologists
German taxonomists
1771 births
1853 deaths
German anatomists
Fellows of the American Academy of Arts and Sciences
People from Waldheim, Saxony
Russian nobility
Academic staff of Moscow State University
Honorary members of the Saint Petersburg Academy of Sciences
18th-century German scientists
18th-century German zoologists
19th-century German zoologists
18th-century German writers
18th-century German male writers
19th-century German writers
19th-century German male writers